
Year 779 (DCCLXXIX) was a common year starting on Friday  of the Julian calendar. The denomination 779 for this year has been used since the early medieval period, when the Anno Domini calendar era became the prevalent method in Europe for naming years.

Events 
 By place 

 Europe 
 Saxon Wars: King Charlemagne assembles a Frankish army at Düren, crosses the Rhine at the modern town of Wesel, and defeats the Saxons in battle near Bocholt (North Rhine-Westphalia). All the main Westphalian leaders are captured, except Widukind. Charlemagne crosses the Weser, Oker and Ohre rivers into Eastphalian territory, where local leaders submit to Frankish rule and hand over hostages. Widukind remains in northern Saxony, and relies on guerrilla warfare.

 Britain 
 Battle of Bensington: King Offa of Mercia defeats his rival Cynewulf of Wessex at Bensington (modern-day Oxfordshire). He seizes control of Berkshire, and probably London as well. According to sources of the Anglo-Saxon Chronicle Offa becomes "King of All England". Charlemagne writes a letter to him as "his dearest brother", but when Offa refuses to let one of Charlemagne's sons marry one of his daughters, Charlemagne threatens to close the ports to English traders.

 Asia 
 June 12 - In China, De Zong (personal name Li Kuo)  succeeds his father Dai Zong, as emperor of the Tang Dynasty.
 March, days unknown - An earthquake in Silla with a magnitude of 6.7–7.0 on the Richter scale kills more than 100 people.

Births 
 Agobard, archbishop of Lyon (approximate date)
 Ibrahim ibn al-Mahdi, Muslim prince (d. 839)
 Jia Dao, Chinese poet and Buddhist monk (d. 843)
 Yuan Zhen, politician of the Tang Dynasty (d. 831)

Deaths 
 June 10 – Dai Zong, emperor of the Tang Dynasty (b. 727)
 December 17 – Sturm, abbot of Fulda
 Æthelred I, king of East Anglia (approximate date)
 Fujiwara no Momokawa, Japanese statesman (b. 732)
 Gerard I, Frankish count
 Walpurga, Anglo-Saxon abbess (or 777)

References